Matías Emanuel Godoy (born 10 January 2002) is an Argentine professional footballer who plays as a forward for Talleres de Córdoba, on loan from Argentinos Juniors.

Club career

Early years
Godoy's career began with Club Central Argentino Olímpico, before he was signed by Atlético de Rafaela in 2011.

Atlético de Rafaela
He was moved in their senior squad in April 2018 at the age of sixteen, subsequently being selected for his professional debut by interim manager Víctor Bottaniz on 16 April during a home defeat to Quilmes in Primera B Nacional; he was substituted on in place of Jorge Velázquez with twenty-two minutes remaining. Godoy netted his first goal in April 2019 against Independiente Rivadavia.

Dinamo Zagreb loan
On 12 February 2020, Godoy joined Prva HNL club Dinamo Zagreb on loan. He never appeared competitively for their first-team, instead featuring for their reserve team in the second tier. Godoy made appearances against Orijent 1919, Hrvatski Dragovoljac and Sesvete–all off the bench–before the season's early end due to the COVID-19 pandemic.

Argentinos Juniors
In September 2020, Godoy completed a six-month loan move to Argentine Primera División side Argentinos Juniors with a purchase option. He was later bought free from Rafaela in the beginning of 2021. On 19 August 2021, Godoy was loaned out to Primera Nacional club Instituto until the end of the year. In February 2022, he joined Talleres de Córdoba on a one-year loan deal.

International career
Godoy represented Argentina's U15s at the 2017 South American Championship, scoring four goals as Argentina won the tournament. In 2018, Godoy was called up to the Argentina U17s for a tournament in Mexico City with Chile, Mexico and the United States. He featured for sixty-eight minutes and scored the opening goal of a 2–1 victory over the United States on 4 October. Godoy made Pablo Aimar's squad in March 2019 for the South American U-17 Championship in Peru, before being selected by Diego Placente for the 2019 Granatkin Memorial months later. He'd play five times and score once, versus Iran, as they won the cup.

In October 2019, Godoy was called up for the 2019 FIFA U-17 World Cup in Brazil. He scored on his second tournament appearance against Cameroon at the Estádio Kléber Andrade on 31 October.

Career statistics
.

Honours
Argentina U15
South American U-15 Championship: 2017
Argentina U17
South American U-17 Championship: 2019
Argentina U18
Granatkin Memorial: 2019

References

External links

2002 births
Living people
Argentine footballers
Argentine expatriate footballers
People from San Cristóbal Department
Sportspeople from Santa Fe Province
Argentina youth international footballers
Association football forwards
Primera Nacional players
First Football League (Croatia) players
Atlético de Rafaela footballers
GNK Dinamo Zagreb II players
Argentinos Juniors footballers
Instituto footballers
Talleres de Córdoba footballers
Expatriate footballers in Croatia
Argentine expatriate sportspeople in Croatia